is a former Japanese football player.

Playing career
Iida was born in Tokyo on April 29, 1982. He joined J1 League club Yokohama F. Marinos from youth team in 2001. On September 14, 2002, he debuted as offensive midfielder against Vegalta Sendai. However he could not play at all in the match in 2003 and retired end of 2003 season.

Club statistics

References

External links

1982 births
Living people
Association football people from Tokyo
Japanese footballers
J1 League players
Yokohama F. Marinos players
Association football midfielders